Saroj Dubey (née Trivedi; 5 September 1938 - 21 June 2020) was an Indian politician. She was elected to the Lok Sabha the lower house of Indian Parliament from Allahabad in Uttar Pradesh in 1991 as a member of the Janata Dal. However, later after the break-up of the Janata Dal, She joined the Rashtriya Janata Dal and was a member of the Rajya Sabha, the upper house of the Parliament of India representing Bihar. Her son Anurag Dubey and daughter-in-law Anu Dubey are Supreme Court lawyers. Her grandson Aditya Dubey is an environmental activist. Her granddaughter Anoushka Tiwari is studying Computer Engineering at Carnegie Mellon University, USA.

References

External links
 Official biographical sketch in Parliament of India website

1938 births
2020 deaths
India MPs 1991–1996
Lok Sabha members from Uttar Pradesh
Janata Dal politicians
Rashtriya Janata Dal politicians
Rajya Sabha members from Bihar
Politicians from Allahabad
People from Faizabad
Deaths from the COVID-19 pandemic in India